Marion Fellows (née Fullarton, born 5 May 1949) is a Scottish National Party (SNP) politician. Since the 2015 General Election, she has been the Member of Parliament for Motherwell and Wishaw. She currently serves as the SNP spokesperson for Disabilities and as an SNP whip. Between June 2017 and January 2020 she was the SNP spokesperson for Small Business, Enterprise and Innovations.

Early life and career 
Fellows studied Accountancy and Finance at Heriot Watt University. For nineteen years, she taught business studies at West Lothian College, where she was an active member of the Educational Institute of Scotland (EIS) trade union.

Political career 
Fellows was elected in 2012 as a North Lanarkshire Councillor for Wishaw, and was active in the "Yes Motherwell and Wishaw" campaign during the 2014 Scottish independence referendum, which managed to achieve a majority in North Lanarkshire for leaving the United Kingdom, which made North Lanarkshire one of only 4 (out of 32) Scottish council districts to vote for independence, despite a national majority voting to stay in the UK.

In 2007, Fellows unsuccessfully contested the Motherwell and Wishaw Scottish Parliament constituency against the incumbent, then-First Minister of Scotland Jack McConnell, and then in 2010 unsuccessfully contested the Motherwell and Wishaw United Kingdom Parliament constituency, losing to the incumbent Frank Roy.

At the 2015 UK general election, Fellows was elected as the MP for Motherwell and Wishaw, with a majority of 11,898 votes. After being elected, she was appointed as an SNP whip in May 2015 and was a member of the Education Committee between July 2015 and May 2017 and then again between September 2017 and November 2019. She was also a member of the Education, Skills and the Economy Sub-Committee between October 2016 and May 2017.

Fellows was re-elected as MP for the seat at the 2017 UK General Election, with a significantly decreased majority of 318 votes. Between October 2018 and November 2019 she was a member of the Administration Committee. In June 2017, she was appointed the SNP spokesperson for Small Business, Enterprise and Innovation, a post she held until January 2020.

Fellows was again re-elected at the 2019 UK general election as the MP for Motherwell and Wishaw, with an increased majority of 6,268 votes. In January 2020, she was appointed the SNP spokesperson for disabilities.

Since January 2020, Fellows has been a member of the Speaker's Committee for the Independent Parliamentary Standards Authority, and since March 2020 she has been a member of the Administration Committee.

Personal life 
She has lived with her family in Wishaw and Bellshill since the 1970s. Marion was married to her husband George, until his death in 2018 from Sarcoma.

References

External links

 Profile on SNP website
 

1949 births
Living people
Female members of the Parliament of the United Kingdom for Scottish constituencies
Members of the Parliament of the United Kingdom for Scottish constituencies
People educated at the Mary Erskine School
People from Wishaw
Place of birth missing (living people)
Scottish National Party councillors
Scottish National Party MPs
Scottish trade unionists
UK MPs 2015–2017
UK MPs 2017–2019
UK MPs 2019–present
21st-century Scottish women politicians
21st-century Scottish politicians
Alumni of Heriot-Watt University
Councillors in North Lanarkshire
People from Irvine, North Ayrshire
Women councillors in Scotland